Aurantiomides are quinazoline alkaloids isolated from the fungus Penicillium aurantiogriseum.

References

Quinazolines